Sembakkam is a residential locality in Tambaram City in Tamil Nadu State, India. It is located between Tambaram and Medavakkam and belongs to Tambaram Taluk Region.

It falls under the Chennai Metropolitan Area (CMA) as notified in 1974. It is located on the Velachery Main Road which has been home to multiple schools and colleges as well as several well known national and international brands.

Sembakkam is well connected to other parts of the city with round-the-clock bus services and by train from Tambaram. Its proximity to Velachery, Tambaram, and OMR has made it into a more premium locality and one of the hottest places in terms of value appreciation.

Administration
In 1984, the village panchayat of Sembakkam was elevated to town panchayat along with the hamlets of Rajakilpakkam and Gowrivakkam.

The town panchayat's population was 21,492 as per figures of the 2001 census. It more than doubled to 45356 as per the census of 2011.

In 2013, Sembakkam was elevated as a municipality. The annual revenue of the town panchayat touched Rs. 5 crore, an important factor that aided its status elevation to municipality, the official said. Spread over 6.27 square kilometres, Sembakkam is divided into 15 wards for administration purposes.

Corporation status awaited
Sembakkam Municipality is set to upgrade as Chennai Tambaram Corporation soon. A proposal was made to TN Government to make Tambaram as Chennai Tambaram Corporation  zone. Tambaram Corporation will encompass two municipalities Sembakkam, Tambaram, four town panchayats in Perungalathur, Peerkankaranai, Madambakkam and Chitlapakkam, and seven village panchayats including Mudichur, Medavakkam, Vengaivasal, Agaramthen.

A proposal for creating three independent municipal corporations Tambaram, Pallavaram, Avadi is under the consideration of the government.

Demographics 

 India census, Sembakkam had a population of 45,356, Males constitute 51% of the population and females 49%.

As per the religious census of 2011, Sembakkam had 78.01% Hindus, 8.21% Muslims, 12.74% Christians, 0.04% Sikhs, 0.04% Buddhists, 0.15% Jains and 0.78% following other religions.

Places of interest

Sembakkam EB children's Park (near EB Office)
This park has  well maintained lawn and orchids, with facilities such as library, water fountain, shuttle ground, walking path and play area for kids.

Alavattamman Kovil Park (Kamarajapuram)
Built around the Alavattamman Kovil Pond area, this park has a long (square-shaped) walking path around the pond, a library, water fountain, shuttle ground and play area for kids.

It also has swing chairs for adults, along the tree shades.

Hindu temples
Many temples are present in and around the area. The Chandra Mouleeswarar temple in Sembakkam, Guruswamy Nagar is one of the best maintained and must-visit temples in the locality. One must look out for Prathosham celebrations (if not even any other special festivals) if you intend to visit the place. One other famous temple in sembakkam is Jambulingeswarar temple, Temple of lord Shiva and Aghilandeswari amman.

 Bhavani Periyapalayathamman Temple, 7th Cross St, Iyyappa Nagar, Sembakkam
 Sri Aganda Paripoorana Sachidananda Sabai, Rajakilpakkam
 Dhenupureeswarar Temple (Madambakkam)
 Aalavattamman Temple, Kamarajapuram
 Ponni amman Koil
 Kamakshi Temple
 Bajanai Koil
 Pillayar Koil
 Karumariamman Temple
 shree maha sakthi puram Temple
 Sri Veda Vyasar Tapovanam
 Jambulingeshwarar Sivan Koil

Churches
 Advent Christian Church, Velachery Tambaram Main Road, Sembakkam,
 Advent Christian Church, Velachery Tambaram Main Road, Santhosapuram
 Zion AG Church, Kamarajapuram
 St Joseph Church, Mahalakshmi Nagar
 CSI St.Mark's Church, Camp Road Junction
 The Ark Victory Church, Sembakkam
 CSI St.John's Church, Madambakkam

Mosque/Masjid
 Masjid Noorunnissa Ahle Hadees, 3rd St, Thirumalai Nagar, Sembakkam
 Masjid E Anwari, Sembakkam
 Masjid Al Haramain, Vallal Yusuf Nagar Main Rd, Sembakkam
 Al Masjid Noor, Mahalakshmi Nagar, Tambaram

Schools
 Shanthinikethan Matriculation Higher secondary school sembakkam
 Shanthinikethan CBSE school sembakkam
 Alpha Matriculation Higher Secondary School, Velachery Main Road, Sembakkam
 BOAZ Public School, Velachery Main Road, Gowrivakkam
 M.A.V. Vidyashram, Kamarajapuram
 Zion Matriculation Higher Secondary School (Branches: Indira Nagar, Madambakkam, Hasthinapuram)
 Alwin Memorial Public School, Indira Nagar
 Olive Public School, Chitlapakkam
 Kanchi Mahasamy Vidya Mandir (CBSE Affiliated), Sembakkam

References

Cities and towns in Chengalpattu district
Suburbs of Chennai